Mar Menor ("minor/smaller sea") is a coastal saltwater lagoon in the Iberian Peninsula located south-east of the Autonomous Community of Murcia, Spain, near Cartagena.

Four municipalities border the Mar Menor: Cartagena, Los Alcázares, San Javier and San Pedro del Pinatar.
With a surface area of 135 km2, a coastal length of 70 km, and warm and clear water no more than 7 metres in depth, it is the largest lagoon in Spain.

The lagoon is separated from the Mediterranean Sea by La Manga ("the sleeve"), a sandbar 22 km in length whose width ranges from 100 to 1,200 metres, with Cape Palos in its south-eastern vertex making for the lagoon's roughly triangular shape. There are five islets located within the lagoon: Perdiguera islet, Mayor or El Barón islet, Ciervo islet, Redonda islet and del Sujeto islet.

Its relatively high salinity (which aids flotation), low waves, and remarkable sporting infrastructures makes it a popular place for a wide variety of water sports.

Ecological importance
At the northern end there are salt flats, which include a wetland of international importance. The microbes that live in this coastal lagoon have been recently described.

In 1994 the Mar Menor was included on the Ramsar Convention list for the conservation and sustainable utilisation of wetlands. 
The Mar Menor is also part of a Specially Protected Area of Mediterranean Importance and is a Special Protection Area (ZEPA in Spanish) for bird life.

In July 2016 pollution was reportedly so severe as to render the area close to ecological collapse, following 18 years of neglected warnings. The public prosecutor's office is investigating allegations of negligence against the relevant authorities, which are governed by the conservative People's Party

In May 2017 all beaches of the Mar Menor were stripped of their Blue Flag status as a result of the polluted condition of the Mar Menor in 2016.

In October 2019 the pollution entering after floods in September led to thousands of dead fish lining the beaches, having suffocated due to a lack of oxygen. Intensive farming in surrounding areas leads to high levels of nitrates, ammonium and phosphates from fertilizers being washed into the lagoon, causing eutrophication, an excessive growth of algae and bacteria that deprives the water of oxygen.

A similar event occurred in August 2021, with four to five tons of dead fish being removed from the lagoon within a week. Shortly thereafter, a large demonstration took place, with 70,000 people surrounding the entire lagoon on August 28, 2021.

Panoramic view of Mar Menor and La Manga

Notes

External links

Mar Menor Tourism Site
Unofficial La Manga del Mar Menor Tourism guide
Mar Menor Activities

Landforms of the Region of Murcia
Lagoons of Europe
Coastal lagoons
Bodies of water of Spain
Wetlands of Spain
Ramsar sites in Spain
Special Protection Areas of Spain
World Heritage Sites in Spain
Biosphere reserves of Spain
Birdwatching sites in Spain
Eutrophication
Protected areas of the Region of Murcia